Şaphane, formerly Abşeker, is a town and district of Kütahya Province in the Aegean region of Turkey. According to 2000 census, population of the district is 11,715 of which 4,671 live in the town of Şaphane.

Tourism
Mt. Şaphane (Akdağ) is open for the mountain tourism with its plateaus that are rich for their oxygen levels. It is 2121 meters high and on a 100,000-hectare area with 20,000 hectares of new planting parts. Paragliding and trekking are some of the activities you can do on Mt. Şaphane.
Kocaseyfullah Mosque is one of our historical spots with its age dating back to 700 years. It is inherited from Anatolian Seljuks. We also have Agha Mansions on which some
investments can be directed.
We have profitable thermal water sources in Karacaderbent ward of Şaphane where some thermal villages, hotels and physical therapy clinic projects can be done.

Medicinal herbs

On Mount Şaphane, there is a variety of medicinal herbs like thyme, sage, linden tree, Ayvadanası, Filistan herb, nigella sativa, urtica dioica, daisy, Papaver rhoeas, sand rose, etc., and many kinds of unexplored plant families.

Cherry and sour cherry

In the district, cherry and sour cherry are cultivated using waterless agricultural methods. There is a quality policy over world standards with 2000 tons of cherry and 7000 tons of sour cherry exported.
The district is open for investments for both industry ( fruit juice – concentrate – marmalade – jam) and export.

Mines

Alum

There is alum mine in the district and the mine area is possessed by Dostel Inc. and it gives 50,000 tons of total production amount per year.

Aluminium sulphate

65000 tons of aluminium sulfate (Al2So4) has been produced by Dostel Inc. in the district. This product is sold mainly to İSKİ and ASKİ. It is also purchased by metropolitan municipalities and standard municipalities’ water authority units and paper factories.

Gold

It was found out, after 15 drilling works made under 500 meters depth conducted by MTA with the provision of ETİBANK in 2000, that gold mine was encountered by the depth of 280 meters. This research was carried out by Canadian research centers. The deposit is not developed.

Marble

There are great quantities of marble and calcite veins under Mt. Şaphane.

Wind energy

North, south and southwest areas of Mt. Şaphane are appropriate for energy production from wind. This energy potential would be enough for meeting the electric energy needs of the district and nearby districts.

Thermal water energy

a) 90 °C hot water (30lt/second) was found after drilling works made under 1326 meters depth in Üçbaş sub-district by MTA in 2006. this thermal source has been opened for bid by MTA.

b) 97 °C hot water was found after drilling works made under 1600 meters depth by MTA in 2007 in Karacaderbent Ward that is on Kütahya-Gediz-Simav-Balıkesir-Bursa highway.

MTA has planned activities in this area in its 2009 agenda that TPAO is going to carry
out drilling projects by the depth of 4000 meters. This area is appealing for both tourism and energy investments because of its proximity to the highway.

Resource: http://kutahyafotolari.turkproforum.com/aphane-f5/aphane-le-merkezi-t178.htm Kütahya Foto&Video Paylaşım Forumu

Notes

References

External links
 District governor's official website 
 Kütahya Photo Forum

	

Populated places in Kütahya Province
Districts of Kütahya Province